Danny O'Brien (born 6 February 1980) is a former Australian rules footballer  for the Geelong Football Club in the Australian Football League (AFL), playing eight games in 2000.

External links
 

1980 births
Living people
Geelong Football Club players
Gippsland Power players
Australian rules footballers from Victoria (Australia)